Central Camera is a camera shop at 230 South Wabash in Chicago, Illinois.

History
Central Camera is the oldest camera store in the city. It opened in 1899 at 31 Adams Street. It was started by a Hungarian immigrant, moved to its current South Loop location in 1929 and is currently operated by a third-generation owner. In 2020, radio station WBBM referred to it as "a museum of photography". 

In 2020, it was burned in a two-alarm fire during the George Floyd protests. The owner stated his intention to repair and reopen the store. A GoFundMe had raised over $200,000 for rebuilding by mid-June 2020. While rebuilding took place, the business operated in an adjacent vacant storefront. The store reopened in June 2022.

References

External links
 Official website

* ABC 7 Chicago news report about Central Camera

Business in Chicago
Companies based in Chicago
1899 establishments in Illinois
Photographic retailers
Photography companies of the United States
Retail companies established in 1899